The 2017 season was BEC Tero Sasana's 21st season in the Thai League T1 since 1997.

Thai League

Thai FA Cup

Thai League Cup

Squad goals statistics

Transfers
First Thai footballer's market is opening on December 14, 2016 to January 28, 2017
Second Thai footballer's market is opening on June 3, 2017 to June 30, 2017

In

Out

Loan in

Notes

References
 BEC Tero Sasana F.C. Official Website 
 Thai League Official Website

External links

Police Tero F.C. seasons
Association football in Thailand lists
BEC Tero Sasana